Andrew Pierce (born Patrick Connolly) is a British journalist, editor, author, broadcaster and political commentator.

Early life
Pierce was born in Bristol to a Roman Catholic Irish mother and an unknown father. He spent the first two years of his life in Nazareth House, a Catholic orphanage in Cheltenham, and was adopted by a family from Swindon and brought up on a council estate there. His adoptive father worked on the assembly line at British Leyland, a former state-owned car factory.

Pierce was educated at St Joseph's Roman Catholic School, now known as St Joseph's Catholic College, a state comprehensive school in Swindon. He did not go to university.

Career in journalism
Pierce is a former  assistant editor of both The Daily Telegraph and  The Times newspapers, and the former political editor of the latter. He is a columnist and consultant editor for the Daily Mail, which he joined in 2009.

Pierce presented a Sunday morning political radio show on the commercial radio station LBC 97.3 from 2008 until he left in 2012. That radio programme was in the latter years presented as a double-headed show with Kevin Maguire from the Daily Mirror. Pierce and Maguire continue their double act reviewing, previewing and dissecting the media and politics on the BBC, ITV and Sky News. He started presenting a Saturday Breakfast show on LBC Radio from 22 March 2014.

In 2014, the Daily Mail had to pay damages to Kirsten Farage after Pierce falsely claimed in a column that she had been a mistress of Nigel Farage, then the leader of UKIP, while he was still married to his first wife. In May 2018, the Daily Mail paid £11,000 towards the legal costs of the writer Kate Maltby after the publication of an article by Pierce about the claims of sexual harassment Maltby made against the politician Damian Green. The article was removed from the Mails website without the publication having made an admission of fault.

He is currently a presenter on GB News.

Personal life
Pierce was raised, and remains, a Roman Catholic. He is gay and was chosen by The Observer in 2005 as one of the "gays who shape our new Britain". He strongly supports civil partnerships, and lives in a long-term civil partnership, per the Civil Partnership Act 2004. He opposed the introduction of same-sex marriage.

In a BBC documentary in 2018 about Greg Owen and the court case National AIDS Trust v NHS Service Commissioning Board, Pierce strongly criticised the idea of taxpayer-funded PrEP, a preventative medication to protect against contracting HIV: "That's what this is about: indulging gay men who don't want to use a condom. Well that's outrageous. Why should the taxpayer subsidise a reckless sex life of people in the gay community?"

Iris Prize
The Iris Prize Festival is a five-day public event in Cardiff, Wales, which includes screenings of the 30 short films competing for the Iris Prize. The Iris Prize is supported by the Michael Bishop Foundation and is the world's largest LGBT short film prize giving the winning filmmaker £30,000 to make their next short film in the UK. Iris-produced shorts include Burger (2013), directed by Magnus Mork List of films at the 2014 Sundance Film Festival, and Followers (2015), directed by Tim Marshall, both of which were selected for the prestigious Sundance Film Festival. Andrew Pierce became Patron of the Iris Prize in 2007, and in 2013 became its first Chair.

During his tenure as chair of the Iris Prize, Pierce has overseen a number of key developments in the festival. In 2014 at a launch reception Pierce announced a new strand at the Iris Prize Festival, Best British Short, and helped secure a sponsorship deal with Pinewood Studios Group totalling £14,000 in post-production sound for the winning filmmaker. In January 2015 it was also announced that the Iris Prize would be increasing from £25,000 to £30,000.

Selected publications

References

External links

Andrew Pierce on Twitter
Andrew Pierce on LBC 

Living people
1961 births
British male journalists
British people of Irish descent
British Roman Catholics
British gay writers
British LGBT journalists
LBC radio presenters
LGBT Roman Catholics
English LGBT writers
GB News newsreaders and journalists
Journalists from Bristol
21st-century LGBT people